South Dakota was admitted to the Union on November 2, 1889, and elects U.S. senators to Class 2 and Class 3. Its current U.S. senators are Republicans John Thune (since 2005) and Mike Rounds (since 2015). Karl E. Mundt is South Dakota's longest-serving senator (1948–1973).

List of senators

|- style="height:2em"
! rowspan=6 | 1
| rowspan=6 align=left | Richard Pettigrew
| rowspan=4  | Republican
| rowspan=6 nowrap | Nov 2, 1889 –Mar 3, 1901
| rowspan=3 | Elected in 1889.
| rowspan=3 | 1
| 
| 1
| Elected in 1889.Lost re-election.
| nowrap | Nov 2, 1889 –Mar 3, 1891
|  | Republican
| align=right | Gideon Moody
! 1

|- style="height:2em"
| 
| rowspan=3 | 2
| rowspan=3 | Elected in 1891.

| rowspan=6 nowrap | Mar 4, 1891 –Jul 1, 1901
|  | Independent
| rowspan=6 align=right | James H. Kyle
! rowspan=6 | 2

|- style="height:2em"
| 
| rowspan=4  | Populist

|- style="height:2em"
| rowspan=3 | Re-elected in 1894.Lost re-election.
| rowspan=3 | 2
| 

|- style="height:2em"
| rowspan=2  | SilverRepublican
| 
| rowspan=5 | 3
| rowspan=3 | Re-elected in 1897.Died.

|- style="height:2em"
| 

|- style="height:2em"
! rowspan=8 | 2
| rowspan=8 align=left |  Robert J. Gamble
| rowspan=8  | Republican
| rowspan=8 nowrap | Mar 4, 1901 –Mar 3, 1913
| rowspan=5 | Elected in 1901.
| rowspan=5 | 3
| 
|  | Republican

|- style="height:2em"
|  
| nowrap | Jul 1, 1901 –Jul 11, 1901
| colspan=3 | Vacant

|- style="height:2em"
| Appointed to continue Kyle's term.Elected in 1903 to finish Kyle's term. 
| rowspan=4 nowrap | Jul 11, 1901 –Mar 3, 1909
| rowspan=4  | Republican
| rowspan=4 align=right | Alfred B. Kittredge
! rowspan=4 | 3

|- style="height:2em"
| 
| rowspan=3 | 4
| rowspan=3 | Elected to a full term in 1903.Lost renomination.

|- style="height:2em"
| 

|- style="height:2em"
| rowspan=3 | Re-elected in 1907.Lost renomination.
| rowspan=3 | 4
| 

|- style="height:2em"
| 
| rowspan=3 | 5
| rowspan=3 | Elected in 1909.Lost renomination.
| rowspan=3 nowrap | Mar 4, 1909 –Mar 3, 1915
| rowspan=3  | Republican
| rowspan=3 align=right | Coe Crawford
! rowspan=3 | 4

|- style="height:2em"
| 

|- style="height:2em"
! rowspan=6 | 3
| rowspan=6 align=left | Thomas Sterling
| rowspan=6  | Republican
| rowspan=6 nowrap | Mar 4, 1913 –Mar 3, 1925
| rowspan=3 | Elected in 1913.
| rowspan=3 | 5
| 

|- style="height:2em"
| 
| rowspan=3 | 6
| rowspan=3 | Elected in 1914.Retired.
| rowspan=3 nowrap | Mar 4, 1915 –Mar 3, 1921
| rowspan=3  | Democratic
| rowspan=3 align=right | Edwin S. Johnson
! rowspan=3 | 5

|- style="height:2em"
| 

|- style="height:2em"
| rowspan=3 | Re-elected in 1918.Lost renomination.
| rowspan=3 | 6
| 

|- style="height:2em"
| 
| rowspan=3 | 7
| rowspan=3 | Elected in 1920.
| rowspan=8 nowrap | Mar 4, 1921 –Dec 20, 1936
| rowspan=8  | Republican
| rowspan=8 align=right | Peter Norbeck
! rowspan=8 | 6

|- style="height:2em"
| 

|- style="height:2em"
! rowspan=3 | 4
| rowspan=3 align=left | William McMaster
| rowspan=3  | Republican
| rowspan=3 nowrap | Mar 4, 1925 –Mar 3, 1931
| rowspan=3 | Elected in 1924.Lost re-election.
| rowspan=3 | 7
| 

|- style="height:2em"
| 
| rowspan=3 | 8
| rowspan=3 | Re-elected in 1926.

|- style="height:2em"
| 

|- style="height:2em"
! rowspan=9 | 5
| rowspan=9 align=left | William J. Bulow
| rowspan=9  | Democratic
| rowspan=9 nowrap | Mar 4, 1931 –Jan 3, 1943
| rowspan=5 | Elected in 1930.
| rowspan=5 | 8
| 

|- style="height:2em"
| 
| rowspan=6 | 9
| rowspan=2 | Re-elected in 1932.Died.

|- style="height:2em"
| 

|- style="height:2em"
|  
| nowrap | Dec 20, 1936 –Dec 29, 1936
| colspan=3 | Vacant

|- style="height:2em"
| rowspan=2 | Appointed to continue Norbeck's term.Lost election to finish Norbeck's term.
| rowspan=2 nowrap | Dec 29, 1936 –Nov 8, 1938
| rowspan=2  | Democratic
| rowspan=2 align=right | Herbert Hitchcock
! rowspan=2 | 7

|- style="height:2em"
| rowspan=4 | Re-elected in 1936.Lost renomination.
| rowspan=4 | 9
| 

|- style="height:2em"
| Elected to finish Norbeck's term.Retired.
| nowrap | Nov 9, 1938 –Jan 3, 1939
|  | Republican
| align=right | Gladys Pyle
! 8

|- style="height:2em"
| 
| rowspan=3 | 10
| rowspan=3 | Elected in 1938.
| rowspan=10 nowrap | Jan 3, 1939 –Jan 3, 1951
| rowspan=10  | Republican
| rowspan=10 align=right | John Gurney
! rowspan=10 | 9

|- style="height:2em"
| 

|- style="height:2em"
! rowspan=3 | 6
| rowspan=3 align=left | Harlan Bushfield
| rowspan=3  | Republican
| rowspan=3 nowrap | Jan 3, 1943 –Sep 27, 1948
| rowspan=3 | Elected in 1942.Died.
| rowspan=7 | 10
| 

|- style="height:2em"
| 
| rowspan=7 | 11
| rowspan=7 | Re-elected in 1944.Lost renomination.

|- style="height:2em"
| 

|- style="height:2em"
| colspan=3 | Vacant
| nowrap | Sep 27, 1948 –Oct 6, 1948
|  

|- style="height:2em"
! 7
| align=left | Vera Bushfield
|  | Republican
| nowrap | Oct 6, 1948 –Dec 26, 1948
| Appointed to finish her husband's term.Resigned when successor appointed.

|- style="height:2em"
| colspan=3 | Vacant
| nowrap | Dec 26, 1948 –Dec 31, 1948
|  

|- style="height:2em"
! rowspan=15 | 8
| rowspan=15 align=left | Karl Mundt
| rowspan=15  | Republican
| rowspan=15 nowrap | Dec 31, 1948 –Jan 3, 1973
| Appointed to finish Bushfield's term, having been elected to the next term.

|- style="height:2em"
| rowspan=3 | Elected in 1948
| rowspan=3 | 11
| 

|- style="height:2em"
| 
| rowspan=3 | 12
| rowspan=3 | Elected in 1950.
| rowspan=6 nowrap | Jan 3, 1951 –Jun 22, 1962
| rowspan=6  | Republican
| rowspan=6 align=right | Francis Case
! rowspan=6 | 10

|- style="height:2em"
| 

|- style="height:2em"
| rowspan=3 | Re-elected in 1954.
| rowspan=3 | 12
| 

|- style="height:2em"
| 
| rowspan=5 | 13
| rowspan=3 | Re-elected in 1956.Died.

|- style="height:2em"
| 

|- style="height:2em"
| rowspan=5 | Re-elected in 1960.
| rowspan=5 | 13
| 

|- style="height:2em"
|  
| nowrap | Jun 22, 1962 –Jul 9, 1962
| colspan=3 | Vacant

|- style="height:2em"
| Appointed to finish Case's term.Lost election to full term.
| nowrap | Jul 9, 1962 –Jan 3, 1963
|  | Republican
| align=right | Joseph H. Bottum
! 11

|- style="height:2em"
| 
| rowspan=3 | 14
| rowspan=3 | Elected in 1962.
| rowspan=9 nowrap | Jan 3, 1963 –Jan 3, 1981
| rowspan=9  | Democratic
| rowspan=9 align=right | George McGovern
! rowspan=9 | 12

|- style="height:2em"
| 

|- style="height:2em"
| rowspan=3 | Re-elected in 1966.Retired.
| rowspan=3 | 14
| 

|- style="height:2em"
| 
| rowspan=3 | 15
| rowspan=3 | Re-elected in 1968.

|- style="height:2em"
| 

|- style="height:2em"
! rowspan=3 | 9
| rowspan=3 align=left | James Abourezk
| rowspan=3  | Democratic
| rowspan=3 nowrap | Jan 3, 1973 –Jan 3, 1979
| rowspan=3 | Elected in 1972.Retired.
| rowspan=3 | 15
| 

|- style="height:2em"
| 
| rowspan=3 | 16
| rowspan=3 | Re-elected in 1974.Lost re-election.

|- style="height:2em"
| 

|- style="height:2em"
! rowspan=9 | 10
| rowspan=9 align=left | Larry Pressler
| rowspan=9  | Republican
| rowspan=9 nowrap | Jan 3, 1979 –Jan 3, 1997
| rowspan=3 | Elected in 1978.
| rowspan=3 | 16
| 

|- style="height:2em"
| 
| rowspan=3 | 17
| rowspan=3 | Elected in 1980.Lost re-election.
| rowspan=3 nowrap | Jan 3, 1981 –Jan 3, 1987
| rowspan=3  | Republican
| rowspan=3 align=right | James Abdnor
! rowspan=3 | 13

|- style="height:2em"
| 

|- style="height:2em"
| rowspan=3 | Re-elected in 1984.
| rowspan=3 | 17
| 

|- style="height:2em"
| 
| rowspan=3 | 18
| rowspan=3 | Elected in 1986.
| rowspan=9 nowrap | Jan 3, 1987 –Jan 3, 2005
| rowspan=9  | Democratic
| rowspan=9 align=right | Tom Daschle
! rowspan=9 | 14

|- style="height:2em"
| 

|- style="height:2em"
| rowspan=3 | Re-elected in 1990.Lost re-election.
| rowspan=3 | 18
| 

|- style="height:2em"
| 
| rowspan=3 | 19
| rowspan=3 | Re-elected in 1992.

|- style="height:2em"
| 

|- style="height:2em"
! rowspan=9 | 11
| rowspan=9 align=left | Tim Johnson
| rowspan=9  | Democratic
| rowspan=9 nowrap | Jan 3, 1997 –Jan 3, 2015
| rowspan=3 | Elected in 1996.
| rowspan=3 | 19
| 

|- style="height:2em"
| 
| rowspan=3 | 20
| rowspan=3 | Re-elected in 1998.Lost re-election.

|- style="height:2em"
| 

|- style="height:2em"
| rowspan=3 | Re-elected in 2002.
| rowspan=3 | 20
| 

|- style="height:2em"
| 
| rowspan=3 | 21
| rowspan=3 | Elected in 2004.
| rowspan=12 nowrap | Jan 3, 2005 –Present
| rowspan=12  | Republican
| rowspan=12 align=right | John Thune
! rowspan=12 | 15

|- style="height:2em"
| 

|- style="height:2em"
| rowspan=3 | Re-elected in 2008.Retired.
| rowspan=3 | 21
| 

|- style="height:2em"
| 
| rowspan=3 | 22
| rowspan=3 | Re-elected in 2010.

|- style="height:2em"
| 

|- style="height:2em"
! rowspan=6 | 12
| rowspan=6 align=left | Mike Rounds
| rowspan=6  | Republican
| rowspan=6 nowrap | Jan 3, 2015 –Present
| rowspan=3 | Elected in 2014.
| rowspan=3 | 22
| 

|- style="height:2em"
| 
| rowspan=3 | 23
| rowspan=3 | Re-elected in 2016.

|- style="height:2em"
| 

|- style="height:2em"
| rowspan=3  | Re-elected in 2020.
| rowspan=3 | 23
| 

|- style="height:2em"
| 
| rowspan=3|24
| rowspan=3 | Re-elected in 2022.

|- style="height:2em"
| 

|- style="height:2em"
| rowspan=2 colspan=5 | To be determined in the 2026 election.
| rowspan=2| 24
| 

|- style="height:2em"
| 
| 25
| colspan=5 | To be determined in the 2028 election.

See also

 United States congressional delegations from South Dakota
 List of United States representatives from South Dakota
 Elections in South Dakota

Notes 

United States Senators
 
South Dakota
United States Senate